The Rollei 35 RF is a version of the Cosina Voigtländer Bessa R2 marketed by Rollei Fototechnic, but manufactured by Cosina, and released in 2002. 

Like the Bessa R2, the Rollei 35 RF has a Leica M-mount and a metal focal-plane shutter. Its TTL exposure meter requires batteries, but batteries are not otherwise needed. Shutter speeds range from 1 to 1/2000 s and bulb (B), with flash sync at 1/125 s on hot-shoe or PC terminal.

Upon release, the most obvious differences from the R2 were the higher price and the slightly different appearance: more silver, and more prominent branding. On the technical side, the shutter speed knob and the grip on the body are slightly redesigned and the framelines are for 40, 50, and 80 mm.

Because of its high price tag and similarity to other contemporary Cosina products, it was treated without much fanfare during its original release. Nowadays it remains a popular Bessa camera for people who wear glasses and primarily use a 40 mm lens.

See also
Rollei 35RF, an unrelated namesake
Rollei 35

External links
 Rollei 35 RF as written up by Rollei
 Rollei 35 RF review at rangefinderforum.com

Cosina rangefinder cameras
35 RF